Blood Mantra is the sixth studio album by Polish death metal band Decapitated. It was released on 22 September 2014 in Poland via Mystic Production and later in September via Nuclear Blast Records in other regions. Blood Mantra was produced by Wojtek and Sławek Wiesławscy. It is the band's first album to feature drummer Michał Łysejko and their only album to feature bassist Paweł Pasek until he returned to the band in 2021 and performed on Cancer Culture in 2022. The song "The Blasphemous Psalm to the Dummy God Creation" was released as a single on 8 August 2014. Two days earlier, the single was released as digital stream on Nuclear Blast YouTube profile.

Background
Blood Mantra is the follow-up to Decapitated's 2011 album Carnival Is Forever. It is the recording debut of drummer Michał Łysejko with the band, who joined the band in January 2014, and also the first album to feature bassist Paweł Pasek. It was recorded at Hertz Studio in Bialystok, Poland, with producers Wojtek and Sławek Wiesławscy. The album cover art was created by Polish artist Łukasz Jaszak.

Guitarist Wacław "Vogg" Kiełtyka commented on the album, "Extreme and groove — I think that's the best way to describe our new album. This time we feel that we have something totally crushing and huge. Blood Mantra is the most heavy and mature album we ever did in our career. I cannot wait to start to play songs live because riffs are soo deep and powerful." He also stated, "We flirt with various tempos mixing death metal with grindcore and almost outright black metal atmosphere together with more, so to speak, 'crowd-puller' beats verging on groovy, almost stoner-rock climates. There are also a few more modern metal rhythmic riffs where we return to the climate of Organic Hallucinosis album. I'm certain that the very fact we are again, after 9 years, in Hertz studio will evoke the spirit of that album. The vocals sound very promising. Rasta [Rafał Piotrowski] is a much more experienced vocalist compared to the Carnival Is Forever album times. And his voice sounds more powerful and deeper."

A music video for "Instinct" was released in October.

Critical reception

In a Blood Mantra review, Revolver stated: "Twelve years after Poland’s Decapitated raised the death-metal bar with its mighty sophomore album, Nihility, the band’s dynamic arrangements and scalpel-edged musicianship are still a wonder to behold".

According to Exclaim!, "Blood Mantra features the band's signature well-executed style, but with the experimental twists that Decapitated have mastered over the years and have provided the distinguishing factor between albums. The band's trademark crushing technicality and heavy, aggressive grooves ("Exiled in Flesh," "Veins") juxtapose with new elements such as melodic passages and avant-garde structures ("Blindness," "Red Sun")".

Track listing

Personnel

Decapitated
 Wacław "Vogg" Kiełtyka – guitars, button accordion
 Rafał "Rasta" Piotrowski – vocals
 Paweł Pasek – bass
 Michał Łysejko – drums

Production
 Wojtek and Sławek Wiesławscy – production, mixing, mastering, recording
 Łukasz Jaszak – artwork

Charts

Release history

References

Decapitated (band) albums
Nuclear Blast albums
2014 albums